Leonard George Thiele AO (26 September 192214 May 1994), professionally Leonard Teale, was a well-known Australian actor of radio, television and film and radio announcer, presenter and narrator known for his resonant baritone voice. He is best remembered for his role in the long-running Australian police procedural drama Homicide as David "Mac" MacKay.

As a professional actor he adopted Teale – a homophone of his birth surname, Thiele – as a stage name.

Biography

Early life
Leonard George Thiele was born in Brisbane, Queensland, to Maude Henrietta Thiele, née Rasmussen, and Herman Albert Thiele, a chemist. He attended Milton State Primary School and Brisbane Grammar School (1934–38) on a scholarship. However, the family's financial situation during the Great Depression forced Leonard to leave school and enter the workforce.  He worked as a junior clerk for Brisbane City Council's Electricity Supply Department. In his spare time, he took up amateur drama, with local repertory groups. From the age of 17, he augmented these activities with a role as a part-time radio announcer, after successfully auditioning at the Australian Broadcasting Commission (ABC) in Brisbane.

Military service
Following the outbreak of World War II, Thiele joined the Militia and served as a signaller. Interested in becoming a pilot, he transferred to the Royal Australian Air Force (RAAF) on 10 October 1942. He graduated from flying school the following year and was commissioned as officer. In 1944, Thiele was posted to the Mediterranean theatre, where he served with No. 458 Squadron RAAF, a maritime patrol/strike unit, flying Vickers Wellingtons, from bases at Foggia, Italy, and Gibraltar. He was promoted to Flight Lieutenant in September 1945 and was discharged on 16 January 1946, after returning to Australia.

Radio serials
Thiele's career as a professional actor commenced in the late 1940s and early 1950s, in radio serials; his roles included that of Superman/Clark Kent and Tarzan. He also made regular appearances in radio variety programs such as the Bonnington's Bunkhouse Show, and voiceovers in countless commercials.

PACT
His talent was nurtured and developed at the Producers Authors Composers and Talent (PACT) Centre, which was founded in 1964.

Films
He appeared in several feature films, including Smiley, Smiley Gets A Gun, and Bungala Boys. 

In the early 1950s, with Raymond Hanson, Roland Robinson and others, Thiele helped form the short-lived Australian Cultural Defence Movement, aimed at protecting local arts and crafts production from the perceived inroads being made by imported content, particularly from the US.  However, the movement faltered after becoming a target of anti-communist activists, (His brother, Neville Thiele, was also targeted, for participating in left-wing theatre.)

TV presenter and actor
Thiele was a co-compère of the radio ABC Children's Session, as "Chris" from 1951 to 1954 (also playing the title role in its Muddle-Headed Wombat serial), his involvement possibly cut short by management for political reasons. At this time he was still using the surname "Thiele" professionally.

Major television roles included a regular comedic role in the Mobil-Limb Show, host roles in variety programs Singalong and Folkmoot, and acting roles in locally produced drama series including Whiplash, The Hungry Ones, Adventure Unlimited, and Consider Your Verdict. He is best remembered, however, for his long-running role as Senior Detective (later Detective Sergeant) David "Mac" Mackay in Homicide from 1965 to 1973. Homicide was Australia's first-ever locally produced TV police drama. Teale won a Logie for best Australian actor in 1974.  He also hosted a documentary about the series, The Homicide Story, in 1970. Other leading television roles included Captain Woolcott in Seven Little Australians (1973), and headmaster Charles Ogilvy in school-based soap opera Class of '74 (1974–75).

Narrator
Teale narrated for ABC audio recordings, including the Banjo Paterson poem The Man from Snowy River, and a spoken-word version of the Led Zeppelin song "Stairway to Heaven" on  ABC-TV's The Money or the Gun. His reading of Dorothea Mackellar's poem "My Country", which included the lines "I love a sunburnt country, a land of sweeping plains" was so widely played in Australia during the 1970s that it was also frequently parodied.

Honours 
He was appointed an Officer of the Order of Australia (AO) in the 1992 Queen's New 
Years Honours List for his services to the performing arts and community.

Personal life

Married three times, Leonard Teale had four children, Amanda, Juli, Jennifer and Melinda.  He married his third wife, entertainer Liz Harris in 1968; Harris had appeared in three episodes of Homicide.

Leonard Teale died of a heart attack in 1994.  A documentary, Homicide: 30 Years On, aired later that year which included reminiscences from former Homicide castmates and footage of an appearance made by himself and Homicide actors George Mallaby and Alwyn Kurts in 1992 presenting a Logie Award for Most Outstanding Series partially in character (with hilarious results).

Filmography

Discography
Leonard Teale & Andy Sundstrom: Songs of the Sundowners LP CBS 1964
Leonard Teale & Andy Sundstrom: Travelling down the Castlereagh LP CBS 1965
Leonard Teale: Leonard Teale's Australia CD - Sony Australia 1994
Leonard Teale: Famous Australian Poems 2011

References

External links
 
 Photo of Leonard Teale in an article about "Homicide" at The Sydney Morning Herald
 Interview with Leonard Teale at Classic Australian Television

1922 births
1994 deaths
20th-century Australian male actors
Australian male radio actors
Australian radio personalities
Australian male television actors
Australian male film actors
Logie Award winners
Male actors from Brisbane
Officers of the Order of Australia
Australian Army personnel of World War II
Australian Army soldiers
Royal Australian Air Force personnel of World War II
Royal Australian Air Force officers
Australian World War II pilots